Thelyssa is a genus of extremely small deep water sea snails, marine gastropod mollusks in the family Seguenziidae.

Species
Species within the genus Thelyssa include:
Thelyssa callisto Bayer, 1971

References

External links
 To ITIS
 To World Register of Marine Species

 
Seguenziidae
Monotypic gastropod genera